This is a list of American children's books. Children's literature includes stories, books, magazines, and poems that are enjoyed by children. Modern children's literature is classified in two different ways: genre or the intended age of the reader.

American children's books

Numeric title

  10,000 Dresses 
  13 Alabama Ghosts and Jeffrey
  5 Little Ducks

A

  Abby Takes a Stand
  ABC Bunny 
  Abraham Lincoln, Friend of the People 
  Abraham Lincoln's World 
  Across America on an Emigrant Train
  The Adventure of Charlie and His Wheat-Straw Hat
  Adventures with Rebbe Mendel
  Aesop's Fables
  Ain't Nobody a Stranger to Me
  Albidaro and the Mischievous Dream
  The All-I'll-Ever-Want Christmas Doll
  The Alligator's Toothache 
  Amber Brown 
  American Girl 
  Americans Before Columbus 
  An American Plague
  Animal Fairy Tales 
  The Anubis Tapestry
  Arilla Sun Down 
  Arnie the Doughnut 
  Away West

B

  Back Home
  A Bad Boy Can Be Good For a Girl
  Best Shot in the West
  Best Word Book Ever 
  Better Known as Johnny Appleseed 
  The Big Tree of Bunlahy 
  Birthdays of Freedom
  Black Cowboy, Wild Horses: A True Story
  Black Diamond: The Story of the Negro Baseball Leagues
  Black Hands, White Sails
  Blackout 
  BLIZZARD! The Storm That Changed America
  The Boys' War: Confederate and Union soldiers talk about the Civil War
  Breaking Stalin's Nose 
  The Bridge to Neverland
  Bruh Rabbit and the Tar Baby Girl
  Bunnies!!!
  Busybody Nora

C

  The Call Of The Wolves
  Cats, Cats, Cats!
  Cat Dreams
  The Cat Who Thought He Was a Tiger
  Cat Nap
  Catwings 
  CDC? 
  Cheetah Math 
  Child of the Wolves
  The Christmas Boot
  Christmas in the Big House, Christmas in the Quarters
  Chrysanthemum 
  Click, Clack, Moo 
  Click, Clack, Quackity-Quack 
  Click, Clack, Splish, Splash
  The Clone Codes
  Cloud Boy 
  Cloudy with a Chance of Meatballs
  Color Me Dark
  Computer Engineer Barbie
  Cool Cat (Hogrogian book)
  A Couple of Boys Have the Best Week Ever 
  The Cow-Tail Switch, and Other West African Stories 
  Crab Moon
  THE CROSSING: How George Washington Saved the American Revolution
  A Curious Collection of Cats
  Curious George 
  Curious George Flies a Kite 
  Curious George Gets a Medal 
  Curious George Goes to the Hospital 
  Curious George Learns the Alphabet 
  Curious George Rides a Bike 
  Curious George Takes a Job 
  Curses, Hexes and Spells
  Cyborg: The Second Book of the Clone Codes

D

  Daisy Gets Lost
  A Daughter of the Seine 
  Davy Crockett
  Days of Jubilee 
  Dear Dumb Diary 
  Dennis the Wild Bull
  Diary of a Spider 
  Dinosaur vs. Bedtime 
  Do Unto Otters 
  Do You Know What I'm Going to Do Next Saturday? 
  Doctor De Soto 
  The Dog Who Had Kittens
  Dooby Dooby Moo 
  The Dream Coach
  Drylongso
  Duck! Rabbit!
  The Duckling Gets a Cookie!?

E

 Encyclopedia Brown (series)
  Encore for Eleanor

F

  The Fairy Circus 
  The Family Book
  A Father's Day Thank You 
  A Fish out of Water 
  The Five Chinese Brothers
  Flat Stanley
  Flora's Very Windy Day
  Flossie & the Fox 
  Flush!: The Scoop on Poop Throughout the Ages 
  Fog Magic 
  Franny K. Stein
  Freedom School, Yes!
  Frederick Douglass: The Lion Who Wrote History
  Friends from the Other Side / Amigos del Otro Lado
  A Friendship for Today
  Frog and Toad All Year 
  Frog and Toad Together

G

  Gandhi, Fighter Without a Sword 
  The Gashlycrumb Tinies 
  George Washington 
  George Washington's World
  God Bless the Child
  Goggles!
  Goin' Someplace Special
  The Golden Fleece and the Heroes Who Lived Before Achilles
  Good Queen Bess: The Story of Elizabeth I of England
  The Grasshopper & the Ants
  The Great Fire
  The Great Kapok Tree 
  Green 
  The Grey Lady and the Strawberry Snatcher

H

  Hachiko Waits
  Half a Moon and One Whole Star
  The Happy Hocky Family!
  Hard Labor: The First African Americans, 1619
  Harry the Dirty Dog 
  Hattie and the Wild Waves 
  Have You Seen Tom Thumb? 
  Heather Has Two Mommies
  Heckedy Peg 
  Help! Mom! There Are Liberals Under My Bed
  The Hired Hand: An African-American Folktale
  The Hollow Tree and Deep Woods Book 
  Hollow Tree Nights and Days 
  The Hollow Tree Snowed-In Book
  Home Place
  The Honest-to-Goodness Truth
  How I Learned Geography
  How To Be A Cat
  Hubert's Hair-Raising Adventure

I

  I Am Abraham Lincoln 
  I Am Albert Einstein 
  I Am Amelia Earhart 
  I Am a Pole (And So Can You!) 
  I Am Rosa Parks 
  I Can Read! 
  I Don't Want To Blow You Up! 
  If You Give a Mouse a Cookie 
  In a Dark, Dark Room and Other Scary Stories
  In for Winter, Out for Spring
  In Plain Sight
  In the Small, Small Pond 
  Interrupting Chicken 
  It's Just a Plant 
  It's Perfectly Normal 
  It's So Amazing
  I Want to Be

J

  The Jacket 
  Jacob's Rescue 
  Jinx
  John Henry
  John, Paul, George & Ben 
  The Jolly Mon
  Journeys With Elijah: Eight Tales of the Prophet
  Just Plain Fancy

K

  Kat Kong 
  Kenny's Window 
  Kermit the Hermit 
  Ketzel, the Cat who Composed

L

  L. Frank Baum's Juvenile Speaker 
  Ladybug Girl 
  The Landry News 
  Leader By Destiny 
  Leonardo da Vinci
  Let My People Go: Bible Stories Told By A Freeman Of Color
  Let's Clap, Jump, Sing & Shout
  Let's-Read-and-Find-Out Science 
  Library Lion 
  Little Bill (series)
  The Little Chapel That Stood 
  Little Grunt and the Big Egg
  The Little Match Girl
  The Little Red Hen
  Little T Learns to Share 
  Lone Journey
  Little Red Riding Hood
  The Long Road to GETTYSBURG

M

  Ma Dear's Aprons
  Madeline 
  Madeline's Christmas 
  Maggie Goes on a Diet
  Mama Cat Has Three Kittens
  The Man Who Could Be Santa
  The Man Who Kept His Heart in a Bucket
  The Marzipan Pig 
  Master Skylark
  Matchless: A Christmas Story
  Max Attacks
  Meteor! 
  Michelangelo
  Mick Harte Was Here
  A Million Fish ... more or less
  Minn of the Mississippi 
  Minnie and Moo: The Attack of the Easter Bunnies 
  Minnie and Moo: The Night of the Living Bed 
  Minnie and Moo: Will You Be My Valentine?
  Minty: A Story of Young Harriet Tubman
  Mirandy and Brother Wind
  Miss Rumphius
  Moo, Baa, La La La!
  Moon Over Manifest
  The Moon Over Star
  Moonshot: The Flight Of Apollo 11
  Mother's Day Surprise
  Mr. Lincoln's Way 
  Mr Shaw's Shipshape Shoeshop 
  My Beautiful Mommy 
  My Dad, John McCain 
  My Name is Aram
  My Pet Human
  My Princess Boy 
  Myth-o-Mania

N

  Nana Upstairs & Nana Downstairs 
  Nansen
  Never Forgotten
  The New England Primer 
  New Found World
  New Shoes for Silvia
  The Nightingale
  Nights of the Pufflings
  Noah's Ark
  Not a Box
  Nzingha: Warrior Queen of Matamba, Angola, Africa, 1595

O

  The Old African
  Ol' Clip-Clop
  Ol' Paul, the Mighty Logger 
  Old Turtle
  Open Wide: Tooth School Inside 
  Outside Over There

P

  Paddle-to-the-Sea 
  Pageant of Chinese History 
  Penguin Problems
  Penn
  The People Could Fly
  The People Could Fly: The Picture Book
  The Perfect Pumpkin Pie 
  Pete the Cat
  The Pigeon Wants a Puppy! 
  Piggie Pie 
  The Pigtail of Ah Lee Ben Loo 
  Pink and Say
  The Planet of Junior Brown
  Porch Lies
  Pretend You're a Cat
  Pretzel 
  Prince Silverwings 
  Probuditi!
  Puss in Boots

R

  Rabbit and the Moon
  Rabbit Makes a Monkey of Lion
  The Railroad to Freedom: A Story of the Civil War 
  Raising Yoder's Barn
  The Random House Book of Mother Goose
  Rebels Against Slavery
  Red-Tail Angels: The Story of the Tuskegee Airmen of World War II
  Rikki-Tikki-Tavi
  Rotten Ralph  (series)
  The Royal Kingdoms of Ghana, Mali, and Songhay
  Run Away Home
  Runner of the Mountain Tops

S

  Sagwa, the Chinese Siamese Cat
  Sam and the Tigers: A New Telling of Little Black Sambo
  The Scaredy Cats 
  Scary Godmother 
  The Scrambled States of America 
  The Scrambled States of America Talent Show 
  Seabird 
  Seven Little Monsters 
  The Shrinking of Treehorn 
  The Sissy Duckling 
  So You Want to Be President?
  Sojourner Truth: Ain't I a Woman? 
  Someone Named Eva 
  Something Queer Is Going On
  A Song for Harlem 
  Spiritual Milk for Boston Babes 
  Splat the Cat 
  Splendors and Glooms 
  Spooky Stories for a Dark and Stormy Night
  Squirrel's New Year's Resolution
  Stack the Cats
  A Starlit Somersault Downhill
  Stitchin' and Pullin'
  The Story about Ping 
  The Story of Appleby Capple 
  Story of the Negro 
  Strega Nona
  The Sunday Outing
  Sweet Whispers, Brother Rush
  Sweethearts of Rhythm: The Story of the Greatest All-Girl Swing Band in the World

T

  Tales from Silver Lands
  Tales of the Kingdom Trilogy
  The Tales of Uncle Remus: The Adventures of Brer Rabbit
  The Talking Eggs: A Folktale from the American South
  The Tangle-Coated Horse and Other Tales 
  Teaching with Calvin and Hobbes
  That is NOT a Good Idea!
  Theodore Roosevelt, Fighting Patriot
  Three Little Kittens
  Three Times Lucky 
  Tía Isa Wants a Car 
  Tic Talk: Living with Tourette Syndrome
  Tik-Tok of Oz
  The Tiny Kite of Eddie Wing
  Tippy Lemmey
  The Tortoise & The Hare
  Tree in the Trail 
  Tru Confessions 
  Truce of the Wolf and Other Tales of Old Italy
  Truck Full of Ducks 
  The Truth About Poop
  Turtle in July
  Turtle in Paradise
  Twinkle, Twinkle, Little Star

U

  The Ugly Duckling
  Uncle Wiggily

V

  A Very Special House 
  A Visit to William Blake's Inn 
  The Voyagers: Being Legends and Romances of Atlantic Discovery

W

  Wayside School (series)
  We Found a Hat
  Wee Winnie Witch's Skinny
  What Will Fat Cat Sit On?  Where Crocodiles Have Wings 
  Where the Wild Things Are 
  Who Will Tell My Brother?  A Whole Nother Story  Why I Will Never Ever Ever Ever Have Enough Time to Read This Book 
  Wiggle 
  William's Doll  Won Ton: A Cat Tale Told in Haiku  The World in 1492  The Wonder Smith and His Son 

Y

  You Read to Me, I'll Read to You  Young, Black, and Determined 
  A YOUNG PATRIOT: The American Revolution as Experienced by One Boy  Young Walter Scott 
  Yummy: the Last Days of a Southside ShortyZ

  Zen Shorts 
  Zen Ties  Zomo The Rabbit: A Trickster Tale From West Africa''

See also

 American children's books (category)
 Series' of children's books (category)
 Lists of books
 List of Canadian children's books
 Books in the United States

References

 
Lists of children's books
Children's